Tingry is a commune in the Pas-de-Calais department in the Hauts-de-France region of France.

Geography

Population

Places of interest
 The church of St.Pierre, dating from the nineteenth century.
 The two 17th century manorhouses of La Haye d'Incourt and Liembrune.
 Traces of a feudal castle.
 An oil pressing mill.

See also
Communes of the Pas-de-Calais department

References

Communes of Pas-de-Calais